Oncideres minuta is a species of beetle in the family Cerambycidae. It was described by James Thomson in 1868. It is known from Ecuador and French Guiana.

References

minuta
Beetles described in 1868